Ruth Kellogg was a  tanker that was built in 1920 as the Design 1025 Hog Islander Calaumet by American International Shipbuilding, Hog Island, Philadelphia, Pennsylvania, United States for the United States Shipping Board (USSB). Completed as Vaba, she was converted to a tanker in 1921. A sale in 1929 saw her renamed Ruth Kellogg. In 1940, she was transferred to the British Ministry of War Transport (MoWT). Renamed Empire Dolphin in 1941, she served until 1947 when she was scrapped.

Description
The ship was built in 1920 by American International Shipbuilding, Hog Island, Philadelphia, Pennsylvania. She was yard number 1540.

History
Calaumet was launched in 1920, and completed that year as the cargo ship Vaba for the USSB. Allocated the United States Official Number 220781, She was operated by Charbonneau Rajola Corporation, New York, until 1921 and then returned to the USSB, which had her converted to a tanker by the Curtis Bay Copper & Iron Works, Curtis Bay, Baltimore, Maryland. In 1923, she was sold to the American-Italian Steamship Co Inc, New York and then resold to Tankers Corporation, New York later that year. In 1924, Vaba was sold to the Steamship Vaba Corporation, New York. She was sold to the Kellogg Steamship Corporation, New York in 1929, and renamed Ruth Kellogg. The Code Letters MBSN were allocated. She was placed under the management of the US Tankship Corporation, New York. The  stood by, ready to assist if needed. The fire was extinguished the next day, and Ruth Kellogg proceeded to New York, arriving on 11 May. With the reallocation of Code Letters in 1934, Ruth Kellog was allocated KDIP. In January 1935, Ruth Kellogg was reported to have come ashore and subsequently refloated, arriving at Baltimore, Maryland on 18 January. In May 1935, she was reported to have come ashore at Philadelphia, Pennsylvania, but was refloated undamaged with the assistance of a tug.

In 1940, Ruth Kellogg was sold to the MoWT. She was placed under the management of Gow, Harrison & Co Ltd. The United Kingdom Official Number 168179 and Code Letters MNPP were allocated. She departed from Curaçao, Netherlands Antilles on 11 May for Kingston, Jamaica, arriving three days later and sailing the same day for Bermuda, where she arrived on 20 May. She was a member of Convoy BHX 45, which departed from Bermuda on 20 May and joined Convoy HX 45 on 29 May. HX 45 had departed from Halifax, Nova Scotia, Canada on 24 May and arrived at Liverpool on 8 June. Ruth Kellogg was carrying fuel oil, and was bound for Brest, France, where she arrived on 7 June. She departed two days later for Barry, Glamorgan, where she arrived on 30 June. Departing three days later, she arrived at the Clyde on 4 July.

Ruth Kellogg was renamed Empire Dolphin in 1941. She apparently spent the war years in home waters, although there are several large gaps in the records of her movements. She served until 1947, when she was scrapped at Briton Ferry, West Glamorgan.

References

1920 ships
Hog Islanders
Design 1025 ships
Steamships of the United States
Merchant ships of the United States
Maritime incidents in 1931
Maritime incidents in 1935
Empire ships
Ministry of War Transport ships
Maritime incidents in March 1942
Ship fires